Ginter Park is a suburban neighborhood of Richmond, Virginia built on land owned and developed by Lewis Ginter. The neighborhood's first well known resident was newspaperman Joseph Bryan, who lived in Laburnum, first built in 1883 and later rebuilt. In 1895, many acres of land north of Richmond were purchased by Ginter in order to develop into neighborhoods. Ginter Park and other neighborhoods were developed from this initial land purchase. In Ginter Park are Union Presbyterian Seminary and as well as Pollard Park.

Nearby are the Children's Hospital of Richmond and John Marshall High School.

While the borders of North Side are not exact, nearby North Side neighborhoods include Barton Heights, Highland Park, Laburnum Park, Sherwood Park and Bellevue.

The Ginter Park Historic District was listed on the National Register of Historic Places in 1986.  It encompasses 291 contributing buildings and 179 contributing structures.

References

External links
 Ginter Park Civic Association

Historic districts on the National Register of Historic Places in Virginia
Streetcar suburbs
Neighborhoods in Richmond, Virginia
National Register of Historic Places in Richmond, Virginia